Dogs of Great Indifference is the fourth album by drummer Jim Black's AlasNoAxis featuring clarinetist/saxophonist Chris Speed, guitarist Hilmar Jensson and bassist Skúli Sverrisson released on the Winter & Winter label in 2006.

Reception

In his review for Allmusic, Dave Lynch said "Maybe a bandleader as accomplished as Black sees Dogs of Great Indifference merely as fun indie rock, but there's also the possibility that in all its contradictions, this music has perfectly captured the Zeitgeist of the mid-2000s, a time when nobody actually agrees upon a common Zeitgeist yet everybody is in it together". In JazzTimes, Andrew Lindemann Malone observed "Those who like to relax with tunes may find Dogs of Great Indifference to be too unsteady, but if you want stimulation, Black and his band are right on the beam". On AllAboutJazz Chris May stated "Dogs Of Great Indifference, the Seattle-born, Brooklyn-based drummer's fourth disc with his AlasNoAxis quartet, is a near-perfect gumbo. Heavy on backbeats and slash and burn guitar riffs, it's also full of astonishing freewheeling collective improvisation and adventure".

Track listing
All compositions by Jim Black
 "Oddfelt" - 7:52  
 "Dogs of Great Indifference" - 6:49  
 "Tars and Vanish" - 7:59  
 "Spins So Free" - 2:22  
 "Star Rubbed" - 3:50  
 "Harmstrong" - 5:21  
 "Everybody Says the Same" - 7:33  
 "You Know Just Because" - 5:12  
 "Desemrascar" - 9:40  
 "Harmsoft" - 1:36  
 "I Am Seven" - 6:51

Personnel
Jim Black - drums
Chris Speed - clarinet, tenor saxophone
Hilmar Jensson - electric guitar
Skúli Sverrisson - electric bass

References

Winter & Winter Records albums
Jim Black albums
2006 albums